Super Islaw is a fictional Filipino superhero created by J. Erastheo Navoa who appeared in some movies and TV Series. He was portrayed by Richard Gomez in the movie Super Islaw and The Flying Kids  and was later revived by Zanjoe Marudo in ABS-CBN's Super Inggo TV series.

Super Islaw and The Flying Kids

Synopsis

Super Islaw was a young crippled boy who was granted mystical powers because of his good heart. He used these abilities to protect the innocents of his town, battling supernatural beings such as vampires.

Cast and Characters

 Richard Gomez as Islaw/Super Islaw
 Janice de Belen as Juanita
 Nadia Montenegro as Adiang
 Kristina Paner as Tinang
 Dranreb Belleza as Andoy
 Anjo Yllana as Perry
 George Estregan as Lucas
 Lito Anzures as Ermitanyo/San Gabriel
 Bomber Moran as Kapitan Barang
 Jaime Fabregas as Padre Jaime
 Palito as Pepe
 Rudy Meyer as Hepe
 Mely Tagasa as Lola Cuna
 Joe Jardi as Bandit

In Super Inggo

 Super Islaw also appeared in ABS-CBN's TV series Super Inggo portrayed by Zanjoe Marudo. In this series, Super Islaw has a son named Super Inggo from his villain wife. The series also features Super Inday as his fiancée.

References

1986 films
Philippine children's films
Tagalog-language films